Leporinus bleheri is a species of Leporinus widely found in the Iténez-Guaporé River basin in South America. This species can reach a length of  SL.

Etymology
It is named in honor of the explorer and ornamental-fish wholesaler Heiko Bleher (b. 1944), who collected the type specimen.

References

Taxa named by Jacques Géry
Taxa described in 1999
Anostomidae